The Round Table class was a small class of trawlers built for the British Royal Navy in 1941–1942.  The class were built by two Aberdeen shipbuilding firms Hall, Russell & Company and J. Lewis & Sons Ltd.

All were built to a 1936 design, the Star of Orkney, by Hall, Russell & Co but were commissioned as minesweepers.  Two of the class, Sir Galahad and Sir Lancelot were converted to danlayers.

Ships
The ships (and assigned pennant numbers) in the class were:
 Sir Agravaine (T230) launched 5 March 1942 
 Sir Galahad (T226) launched 18 December 1941	
 Sir Gareth (T227) launched 19 January 1942
 Sir Geraint (T240) launched 15 April 1942
 Sir Kay (T241) launched 26 October 1942
 Sir Lamorack (T242) launched 23 November 1942 
 Sir Lancelot (T228) launched 4 December 1941
 Sir Tristram (T229) launched 17 January 1942

See also
 Trawlers of the Royal Navy

References

Minesweepers of the Royal Navy
Naval trawlers of the United Kingdom
 
Ship classes of the Royal Navy